Juha Gustafsson (born April 24, 1979) is a Finnish former ice hockey player.

Career 
He joined Tingsryd AIF in the Swedish 3rd division in September 2009. He came to Sport Ghiaccio Pontebba from Espoo Blues of the Finnish SM-liiga in January 2009. In season 1999–2000 Gustafsson won the Euro Hockey Tour with Team Finland. In 2007, he won the Tampere Cup.  He was drafted 43rd overall by the Phoenix Coyotes in the 1997 NHL Entry Draft.

Career statistics

External links

1979 births
Living people
Finnish ice hockey defencemen
Espoo Blues players
Tappara players
Arizona Coyotes draft picks
Tingsryds AIF players
Ice hockey people from Helsinki
21st-century Finnish people